Velleda (minor planet designation: 126 Velleda) is a main-belt asteroid. It is probably a rather typical, albeit sizable, S-type asteroid. Named for Veleda, a priestess and prophet of the Germanic tribe of the Bructeri.  It was discovered by Paul Henry on November 5, 1872, in Paris, France. It was his first credited discovery. He and his brother Prosper Henry discovered a total of 14 asteroids.

The orbital plane is inclined by 2.9° to the plane of the ecliptic. It has a cross-section diameter of ~45 km. This asteroid rotates once every 5.36 hours. During each rotation the brightness varies by 0.22 magnitudes.

References

External links 
 
 

000126
000126
Discoveries by Paul Henry and Prosper Henry
Named minor planets
18721105